Tuscon  may refer to: 

TusCon, science fiction convention
Tucson, Arizona, commonly misspelled

See also
Tuscan (disambiguation)